Óscar Freire Gómez (born 15 February 1976) is a former Spanish professional road bicycle racer. He was one of the top sprinters in road bicycle racing, having won the world championship three times, equalling Alfredo Binda, Rik Van Steenbergen, Eddy Merckx and Peter Sagan. In the later years of his career, he became more of a classics rider. He has won the cycling monument Milan–San Remo three times, four stages in the Tour de France and seven stages of the Vuelta a España, throughout a successful career.

Despite his diminutive stature, Freire was a good sprinter. He had a training philosophy where he rode shorter distances than most pro cyclists, sometimes covering only about half the distance his colleagues would. When growing up he contracted tuberculosis and narrowly avoided having a leg amputated.

Career

Vitalicio Seguros (1998–1999)
Born in Torrelavega, Cantabria, (where the town has named a velodrome in his honour) Freire became professional in 1998 with Vitalicio Seguros. He won one race that year, a stage of the Vuelta a Castilla y León. He came 11th in Paris–Tours. In 1999, Freire won little until the world championship in October. He went to Verona to make up numbers in the Spanish team. He spent his prize on an elevator for his grandmother's apartment. After his victory, as with all his victories, his grandmother sung a regional folk song on his telephone. Prior to winning the World Championships, ONCE had expressed interest in signing him, but following victory his inflated price was too high, meaning that he never rode for a native team again.

Mapei–Quick Step (2000–2002)
Freire joined Mapei in 2000. It had been ranked best team since 1994. That year he won 11 races including two stages in the Vuelta a España. He also came third place in the world championship. In 2001 he won two races and took the points competition in the Vuelta a Burgos, before becoming world champion for the second time. In 2002 he won a stage in the Tour de France. Upon joining the team, he spent his salary on a new family home for his parents and grandmother.

Rabobank (2003–2011)
In 2003, Freire moved to Rabobank, where in his first season he won six races. In 2004 he won Milan–San Remo, Trofeo Luis Puig, a stage and second place overall in Tirreno–Adriatico, a stage in the Vuelta a España and for the third time, and the second time in Verona, the world championship. He started 2005 winning three stages, the points classification and the yellow jersey at Tirreno–Adriatico, as well as the Brabantse Pijl, Trofeo Alcúdia and Trofeo Mallorca, all before the end of March. His season was then cut short by a saddle sore.

In 2006, Freire won his second consecutive Brabantse Pijl. His stage 3 win at Tirreno–Adriatico allowed him to lead for two days. At the Tour de Suisse, he survived an early break of four riders to win alone on stage 7. Freire won the fifth and ninth stages in the 2006 Tour de France and was contesting the points classification when he retired due to illness. During stage twelve, he was in a breakaway with three others. Freire's career has been blighted with injury and lay-offs. He had back problems, saddle sores and neck problems.
When Yaroslav Popovych, riding for the Discovery Channel Pro Cycling Team, rode away for victory, rumours spread that Freire had been ordered by Rabobank not to ride for the victory, to secure help from the Discovery Team in the mountains. Although rumours were denied by both teams, Freire was upset after the stage. Freire continued his successful year by winning the Vattenfall Cyclassics ahead of German favourite Erik Zabel. Freire had half of Rabobank's victories in 2006. His season was cut short by neck and spinal injuries, forcing him to miss the Vuelta a España and world championship. Freire re-signed for Rabobank in late 2006 until the end of 2008, rejecting Saunier Duval–Prodir.

In the 2007 Tour de France, he did not win a stage, partly because Rabobank was defending Michael Rasmussen's lead for a large part of the race. But he won three stages in the Vuelta a España. In the 2008 Tour, Freire wore the green jersey from stage 8. He won stage 14 and the points classification. In the 2009 Tour he and Julian Dean were shot by an air rifle during the 13th stage from Vittel to Colmar. He was shot in the thigh and finished the stage 117th.

In March 2010, Freire won the 2010 Milan–San Remo in front of Tom Boonen and Alessandro Petacchi. On 10 October 2010 Freire became the first Spaniard to win Paris–Tours and in doing so became the new holder of the Ruban Jaune for setting the fastest average speed in a classic race, he covered the 233 km at an average of 47.73 km per hour.

Shortly before the 2011 UCI Road World Championships it was announced that Óscar Freire would retire at the end of the season if he did not win the World Championship road race. Freire ended negotiations to continue his contract with his team before the race, and noted health issues include worsening respiratory problems, having had sinus and nasal surgery in the last two years. He was unable to race the 2011 Tour de France and was forced to abandon the 2011 Vuelta a España.

Team Katusha (2012)
Initially, Freire planned to finish his career by 2012, but at the end of season 2011 he suddenly changed his mind. While his home Rabobank team, confused by the situation and Oscar's indecision, failed to provide him an extension for another year, Freire had to start talks with other teams. Omega Pharma–Quick-Step, Lotto–Belisol and Geox–TMC expressed their interest to secure his service for season 2012, but Freire chose Team Katusha. He was reported to have been swayed by Team Katusha because the Russian team had a good number of other Spanish riders on its roster along with its well-organised structure and guaranteed entry into WorldTour races.

By 2012 Freire fully recovered from his previous health problems and managed to show very good results at the first opening races. In January he won stage 3 of Australian Tour Down Under, and then completed his success at stage 3 of Vuelta a Andalucía. At the spring classics Óscar Freire finished 7th at Milan–San Remo, while having taken two second places: one at E3 Harelbeke where he was edged on the line by Tom Boonen and the other at the Brabantse Pijl, where he dominated the sprint of the chasers after lone escapee Thomas Voeckler of  had crossed the line. He then went on to finish 4th in the Amstel Gold Race. He was passed in the final meters, but managed to hold on for fourth.

In an interview to the French magazine Velochrono, Freire claimed to take part in the Olympics in London along with the Tour de France and UCI Road World Championships. Freire later admitted that he was contemplating retirement if he didn't win the rainbow jersey, and that he would keep riding for another year or two if he wins the 2012 UCI Championships. The Basque team was suspected of trying to hoard in Freire's crucial UCI World Tour points, which would help them get a World Tour license for 2013, but the team management denied it. In retirement he went to live, with his family, in Switzerland.

Career achievements

Major results

1997
 2nd  Road race, UCI Road World Under-23 Championships
1998
 1st Stage 1 Vuelta a Castilla y León
 3rd Road race, National Road Championships
 3rd Clásica de Almería
 3rd Circuito de Getxo
 4th GP Villafranca de Ordizia
 5th Giro della Romagna
1999
 1st  Road race, UCI Road World Championships
2000
 1st Trofeo Palma de Mallorca
 Vuelta a España
1st Stages 2 & 4
Held  after Stages 4–7
 Tirreno–Adriatico
1st Stages 1 & 6
 1st Stage 3 Volta a la Comunitat Valenciana
 1st Stage 3 Giro della Provincia di Lucca
 2nd Trofeo Luis Puig
 3rd  Road race, UCI Road World Championships
 3rd Overall Escalada a Montjuïc
1st Stage 1a 
 3rd Milan–San Remo
 4th Trofeo Sóller
 5th Clásica de San Sebastián
 6th Züri-Metzgete
 8th Overall Vuelta a Aragón
1st  Points classification
1st Stages 3 & 4
 8th Lancaster Classic
 9th Amstel Gold Race
2001
 1st  Road race, UCI Road World Championships
 Vuelta a Burgos
1st  Points classification
1st Stage 5
 1st Stage 4 Deutschland Tour
 2nd Paris–Tours
2002
 1st Trofeo Manacor
 1st Trofeo Sóller
 1st Stage 2 Tour de France
 3rd Overall Tirreno–Adriatico
 4th Rund um den Henninger Turm
 5th Milan–San Remo
 5th Amstel Gold Race
2003
 1st  Overall Giro della Provincia di Lucca
1st Stage 1 & 2
 Vuelta a Andalucía
1st  Points classification
1st Stage 1 & 2
 1st Stage 7 Tirreno–Adriatico
 1st Stage 5 Volta a Catalunya
 2nd Brabantse Pijl
 4th Rund um den Henninger Turm
 4th Trofeo Manacor
 5th Gran Premio Bruno Beghelli
 6th Paris–Brussels
 6th Trofeo Sóller
 7th Milan–San Remo
 8th Overall Ronde van Nederland
 9th Road race, UCI Road World Championships
2004
 1st  Road race, UCI Road World Championships
 1st Milan–San Remo
 1st Trofeo Luis Puig
 1st Trofeo Alcúdia
 1st Stage 6 Vuelta a España
 1st  Points classification Tour de Luxembourg
 2nd Overall Tirreno–Adriatico
1st Stage 3 
 2nd Trofeo Palma de Mallorca
 3rd Trofeo Calvià
 4th HEW Cyclassics
 9th Overall Sachsen Tour
 9th Züri-Metzgete
2005
 1st  Overall Tirenno–Adriatico
1st  Points classification
1st Stages 2, 3 & 4
 1st Brabantse Pijl
 1st Trofeo Alcúdia
 1st Trofeo Palma de Mallorca
 3rd Trofeo Luis Puig
 5th Milan–San Remo
 5th La Flèche Wallonne
2006
 1st Brabantse Pijl
 1st Vattenfall Cyclassics
 1st RaboRonde Heerlen
 Tour de France
1st Stages 5 & 9
 1st Stage 7 Tour de Suisse
 1st Stage 4 Tour of the Basque Country
 1st Stage 3 Tirenno–Adriatico
 6th Milan–San Remo
2007
 1st  Overall Vuelta a Andalucía
1st  Points classification
1st Stages 2 & 5
 1st Milan–San Remo
 1st Brabantse Pijl
 1st Trofeo Palma de Mallorca
 Vuelta a España
1st Stages 2, 5 & 6
Held  after Stages 2–3
Held  after Stages 2–9
 2nd Vattenfall Cyclassics
 3rd Gent–Wevelgem
 3rd Paris–Tours
 8th Amstel Gold Race
 10th Trofeo Calvià
2008
 1st Gent–Wevelgem
 Tour de France
1st  Points classification
1st Stage 14
 Tirreno–Adriatico
1st  Points classification
1st Stages 1, 4 & 6
 1st Stage 11 Vuelta a España
 1st Stage 1 Tour de Suisse
 2nd Clásica de Almería
 8th Milan–San Remo
2009
 Tour de Romandie
1st Stages 2 & 5
 5th Paris–Tours
2010
 1st Milan–San Remo
 1st Paris–Tours
 1st Trofeo Calla Millor
 Tour of the Basque Country
1st Stages 1 & 2
 Vuelta a Andalucía
1st  Points classification 
1st Stages 2 & 3
 3rd Trofeo Palma de Mallorca
 6th Road race, UCI Road World Championships
 8th Overall Tour of Belgium
 9th Brabantse Pijl
2011
 Vuelta a Andalucía
1st  Points classification
1st Stages 3 & 4
 1st Stage 1 (TTT) Tirreno–Adriatico
 2nd Trofeo Magaluf-Palmanova
 6th Amstel Gold Race
 7th Grand Prix de Wallonie
 9th Road race, UCI Road World Championships
2012
 1st Stage 4 Tour Down Under
 1st Stage 3 Vuelta a Andalucía
 2nd E3 Harelbeke
 2nd Brabantse Pijl
 3rd Paris–Brussels
 4th Gent–Wevelgem
 4th Amstel Gold Race
 7th Milan–San Remo
 10th Road race, UCI Road World Championships

General classification results timeline

Classics results timeline

References

External links

Official Site 
Profile on Katusha website 

Oscar Freire's Profile on Cycling Base

Cyclists from Cantabria
Cyclists at the 2000 Summer Olympics
Cyclists at the 2004 Summer Olympics
Cyclists at the 2008 Summer Olympics
Olympic cyclists of Spain
Spanish male cyclists
Spanish Tour de France stage winners
UCI Road World Champions (elite men)
1976 births
Living people
People from Torrelavega
Spanish Vuelta a España stage winners
Tour de Suisse stage winners